Karle may refer to:

Places 
 Karle (Svitavy District), a municipality and village in the Czech Republic
 Karli, India, a town in Maharashtra, India
 Karla Caves, a complex of Buddhist cave shrines
 Karle, Belgaum, a settlement in Belgaum district, Karnataka, India
 Karle, Chamarajanagar, a settlement in Chamarajanagar district, Karnataka, India
 Karle, Hassan district, a settlement in Hassan district, Karnataka, India

Other uses 
 Karle (name), a given name and surname (including a list of persons with the name)
 Karle IF, a Swedish football club

See also 

Karie (disambiguation)
 Karl (disambiguation)
 Carle, a surname (including a list of persons with the name)
 Kahle, a surname (including a list of persons with the name)